Triodia pungens, commonly known as soft spinifex, is a species of grass native to northwestern Australia.

Originally described by botanist Robert Brown in his 1810 work Prodromus Florae Novae Hollandiae, Triodia pungens still bears its original binomial name.

References

Chloridoideae
Bunchgrasses of Australasia
Endemic flora of Australia
Poales of Australia
Plants described in 1810